Kalynivske is an urban-type settlement in Beryslav Raion of Kherson Oblast in Ukraine. It is located on the left bank of the Inhulets river, a right tributary of the Dnieper. Kalynivske hosts the administration of Kalynivske settlement hromada, one of the hromadas of Ukraine. It has a population of 

Before 2016, the settlement was known as Kalininske, after Mikhail Kalinin. On 17 Match 2016 that the Verkhovna Rada adopted the resolution to rename Kalininske as Kalynivske and conform to the law prohibiting names of Communist origin.

Until 18 July 2020, Kalynivske belonged to Velyka Oleksandrivka Raion. The raion was abolished in July 2020 as part of the administrative reform of Ukraine, which reduced the number of raions of Kherson Oblast to five. The area of Velyka Oleksandrivka Raion was merged into Beryslav Raion.

Kalynivske was occupied by the Russian forces during the beginning of the 2022 Russian invasion of Ukraine. On 9 November 2022 it was reported that Ukrainian forces had re-entered Kalynivske.

Economy

Transportation
There is infrequent passenger traffic.

The settlement is connected by road with Snihurivka and Velyka Oleksandrivka with further connections to Kherson, Mykolaiv, and Kryvyi Rih.

References

Urban-type settlements in Beryslav Raion